Zil-e-Huma is a Pakistani politician who served as member of the National Assembly of Pakistan.

Political career
She was elected to the National Assembly of Pakistan as a candidate of Pakistan Peoples Party on a seat reserved for women from Balochistan in the 2008 Pakistani general election. During her tenure as Member of the National Assembly, she served as federal Parliamentary Secretary for Women Development before being appointed as federal Parliamentary Secretary for the Economic Affairs in June 2011.

References

21st-century Pakistani women politicians
Living people
Pakistani MNAs 2008–2013
Women members of the National Assembly of Pakistan
Year of birth missing (living people)